The Jamaican red macaw (Ara gossei) is a hypothetical species of parrot in the family Psittacidae that lived on Jamaica.

History
The only reported specimen was shot on Jamaica around 1765, and was later seen by a Dr. Robertson when it was stuffed; the specimen has since been lost. Robertson sent a description of it to Philip Henry Gosse, who published his own description in 1847:

Robertson stated the bird had never been seen or figured before, and that it was very different from any macaw he had ever seen. One 1765 illustration is thought to depict this bird, but has also been suggested to be an imported Cuban macaw. The parrot was considered identical to the Cuban macaw by some 19th-century naturalists, but was given its own binomial by Rothschild in 1905.

References

External links

Ara (genus)
Birds described in 1905
Controversial parrot taxa
Extinct animals of Jamaica
Extinct birds of the Caribbean
Taxa named by Walter Rothschild
Taxonomy articles created by Polbot
Hypothetical extinct species
Taxobox binomials not recognized by IUCN